The 2022–23 season is the 75th season in the history of 1. FC Köln and their fourth consecutive season in the top flight. The club are participating in the Bundesliga, the DFB-Pokal and the UEFA Europa Conference League.

Players

Players out on loan

Transfers

In

Out

Pre-season and friendlies

Competitions

Overall record

Bundesliga

League table

Results summary

Results by round

Matches 
The league fixtures were announced on 17 June 2022.

DFB-Pokal

UEFA Europa Conference League

Play-off round 

The draw for the play-off round was held on 2 August 2022.

Group stage 

The draw for the group stage was held on 26 August 2022.

Statistics

Appearances and goals 

|-
! colspan=14 style=background:#dcdcdc; text-align:center| Goalkeepers

|-
! colspan=14 style=background:#dcdcdc; text-align:center| Defenders

|-
! colspan=14 style=background:#dcdcdc; text-align:center| Midfielders

|-
! colspan=14 style=background:#dcdcdc; text-align:center| Forwards

 

 

|-
! colspan=14 style=background:#dcdcdc; text-align:center| Players transferred out during the season

Goalscorers 

Last updated: 12 February 2023

References 

1. FC Köln seasons
Koln
Koln